Qezeljeh-ye Sofla (also Romanized as Qezeljeh-ye Soflá) is a village in Qanibeyglu Rural District, Zanjanrud District, Zanjan County, Zanjan Province, Iran. At the 2006 census, its population was 82, in 18 families.

References 

Populated places in Zanjan County